Chresten Scott Davis (born 16 September 1975) is a former New Zealand rugby union player. He was a member of the New Zealand national side, the All Blacks, on the 1996 tour of South Africa, playing two matches but no internationals.

References

1975 births
Living people
Rugby union players from Hamilton, New Zealand
Massey University alumni
New Zealand rugby union players
New Zealand international rugby union players
Manawatu rugby union players
Waikato rugby union players
Hurricanes (rugby union) players
Chiefs (rugby union) players
Blues (Super Rugby) players
Hanazono Kintetsu Liners players
New Zealand expatriate sportspeople in Japan
Expatriate rugby union players in Japan
New Zealand expatriate sportspeople in Italy
Expatriate rugby union players in Italy